The 1988–89 Phoenix Suns season was the 20th season for the Phoenix Suns of the National Basketball Association. The Suns had the seventh pick in the 1988 NBA draft, which they used to select Tim Perry out of Temple University, and also selected future All-Star Dan Majerle from the University of Central Michigan with the fourteenth pick. During the off-season, the Suns fired head coach John Wetzel and replaced him with director of player personnel (and former head coach) Cotton Fitzsimmons, who coached the team for the '70–'71 and '71–'72 seasons, and signed free agent and one-time All-Star forward Tom Chambers. The Suns showed a lot of improvement over the previous season, holding a 29–17 record at the All-Star break, posting a nine-game winning streak between March and April, and finishing second in the Pacific Division with a 55–27 record. All home games were played at Arizona Veterans Memorial Coliseum.

Chambers led a triplet of Suns who averaged 20 points or more for the season, with Chambers averaging 25.7 points and 8.4 rebounds per game. In addition, sixth man Eddie Johnson averaged 21.5 points per game off the bench, and earned the season's Sixth Man of the Year Award, while second-year point guard Kevin Johnson, who enjoyed his first full season with the Suns after a midseason trade the year before, provided the team with 20.4 points, 12.2 assists and 1.7 steals per game, and earned the Most Improved Player of the Year Award, while finishing third in the league behind John Stockton and Magic Johnson in assists per game. Second-year forward Armen Gilliam averaged 15.9 points and 7.3 rebounds per game, while Jeff Hornacek contributed 13.5 points, 6.0 assists and 1.7 steals per game, Majerle provided with 8.6 points per game in only 54 games, Tyrone Corbin contributed 8.2 points and 5.2 rebounds per game, and Mark West provided with 7.2 points, 6.7 rebounds and 2.3 blocks per game. Fitzsimmons was named Coach of the Year after leading his team to a 27-game improvement.

In the playoffs, the Suns swept the Denver Nuggets in three straight games in the Western Conference First Round, and defeated the 7th-seeded Golden State Warriors four games to one in the Western Conference Semi-finals. The Suns saw their playoff fortunes reverse in the Conference Finals, when they met the season's MVP Magic Johnson, and the top-seeded Los Angeles Lakers, getting swept four games to zero. The Lakers would reach the NBA Finals for the third consecutive year, but would lose to the Detroit Pistons in four straight games.

Chambers was the only member of the team to be selected for the 1989 NBA All-Star Game, which was his second All-Star appearance. At season's end, Chambers and Johnson were both members of the All-NBA Second Team. Following the season, Corbin left in the 1989 NBA Expansion Draft.

NBA Draft

The Suns used their first-round pick to select power forward Tim Perry from Temple. Perry averaged 10.5 points and 7.6 rebounds per game in four years with the Owls. In his first three years with the Suns, Perry would average 4.2 points and 2.4 rebounds per game playing in a limited role. After becoming a starter in the 1991–92 season, Perry averaged 12.3 points, 6.9 rebounds and 1.5 blocks per game. After the season, he was traded, alongside Jeff Hornacek and Andrew Lang, to the Philadelphia 76ers for superstar forward Charles Barkley.

The Suns received the 14th pick from a trade with the Cleveland Cavaliers in 1988. With the pick they would select swingman Dan Majerle from Central Michigan. Majerle averaged 21.8 points, 8.9 rebounds and 2.2 assists per game in four years with the Chippewas. Majerle would spend his first seven seasons with the Suns, appearing in three All-Star games before being traded to the Cleveland Cavaliers in 1995. He would return to play for the Suns in the 2001–02 season before retiring. His number 9 jersey was retired by the franchise in 2003.

The Suns received the 28th pick from a trade with the Milwaukee Bucks in 1988. With the pick they would select center Andrew Lang from Arkansas. Lang averaged 6.9 points, 5.7 rebounds and 1.6 blocks per game in four years with the Razorbacks. Like Perry, Lang played a limited role in his first three seasons, averaging 3.7 points, 3.6 rebounds and 1.5 blocks per game. After becoming a starter in the 1991–92 season, Lang averaged 7.7 points, 6.7 rebounds and 2.5 blocks per game, before being traded to the 76ers.

In 1987, the Suns traded their second-round pick to the Sacramento Kings for Eddie Johnson. The pick was then traded to the New York Knicks and then to the Detroit Pistons, who selected small forward Fennis Dembo with the 30th pick.

The Suns received the 38th pick from a trade with the Cleveland Cavaliers in 1988. With the pick they would select center Dean Garrett from Indiana. Garrett averaged 13.6 points and 8.5 rebounds per game in two years with the Hoosiers. Garrett suffered a fractured foot before appearing in any games, and missed the entire season. He was waived before the start of the 1989–90 season without appearing in any games for the franchise.

The Suns received the 50th pick from a trade with the Los Angeles Lakers in 1985. With the pick they would select guard Steve Kerr from Arizona. Kerr averaged 11.2 points and 3.4 assists per game in four years with the Wildcats. Kerr would spend most of his rookie season on the injured reserve, averaging 2.1 points per game in 26 games, before being traded to the Cleveland Cavaliers in 1989.

The Suns used their third-round pick to select point guard Rodney Johns from Grand Canyon. Johns averaged 13.2 points, 3.7 rebounds and 4.0 assists per game in two years with the Antelopes. The Suns signed Johns to a contract on September 27, but he was waived on November 1 before the start of the season.

Roster

Roster Notes
 Rookie center Dean Garrett missed the entire season due to a fractured foot, and never played for the Suns.

Regular season

Standings

Record vs. opponents

Playoffs

Game log

|- align="center" bgcolor="#ccffcc"
| 1
| April 28
| Denver
| W 104–103
| Chambers, K. Johnson (26)
| Tom Chambers (17)
| Kevin Johnson (9)
| Arizona Veterans Memorial Coliseum14,471
| 1–0
|- align="center" bgcolor="#ccffcc"
| 2
| April 30
| Denver
| W 132–114
| Kevin Johnson (34)
| Tom Chambers (12)
| Kevin Johnson (14)
| Arizona Veterans Memorial Coliseum14,471
| 2–0
|- align="center" bgcolor="#ccffcc"
| 3
| May 2
| @ Denver
| W 130–121
| Chambers, K. Johnson (32)
| Tom Chambers (17)
| Kevin Johnson (16)
| McNichols Sports Arena12,660
| 3–0

|- align="center" bgcolor="#ccffcc"
| 1
| May 6
| Golden State
| W 130–103
| Tom Chambers (25)
| Eddie Johnson (9)
| Kevin Johnson (11)
| Arizona Veterans Memorial Coliseum14,471
| 1–0
|- align="center" bgcolor="#ffcccc"
| 2
| May 9
| Golden State
| L 122–127
| Eddie Johnson (35)
| Eddie Johnson (9)
| Kevin Johnson (12)
| Arizona Veterans Memorial Coliseum14,471
| 1–1
|- align="center" bgcolor="#ccffcc"
| 3
| May 11
| @ Golden State
| W 113–104
| Tom Chambers (31)
| Chambers, Corbin (14)
| Kevin Johnson (15)
| Oakland–Alameda County Coliseum Arena15,025
| 2–1
|- align="center" bgcolor="#ccffcc"
| 4
| May 13
| @ Golden State
| W 135–99
| Eddie Johnson (34)
| Tyrone Corbin (13)
| Hornacek, K. Johnson (8)
| Oakland–Alameda County Coliseum Arena15,025
| 3–1
|- align="center" bgcolor="#ccffcc"
| 5
| May 16
| Golden State
| W 116–104
| three players tied (24)
| Chambers, E. Johnson (11)
| Kevin Johnson (11)
| Arizona Veterans Memorial Coliseum14,471
| 4–1

|- align="center" bgcolor="#ffcccc"
| 1
| May 20
| @ L.A. Lakers
| L 119–127
| Kevin Johnson (27)
| Tom Chambers (10)
| Kevin Johnson (18)
| Great Western Forum17,505
| 0–1
|- align="center" bgcolor="#ffcccc"
| 2
| May 23
| @ L.A. Lakers
| L 95–101
| Kevin Johnson (22)
| Tom Chambers (10)
| Kevin Johnson (10)
| Great Western Forum17,505
| 0–2
|- align="center" bgcolor="#ffcccc"
| 3
| May 26
| L.A. Lakers
| L 107–110
| Tom Chambers (26)
| Jeff Hornacek (11)
| Kevin Johnson (15)
| Arizona Veterans Memorial Coliseum14,471
| 0–3
|- align="center" bgcolor="#ffcccc"
| 4
| May 28
| L.A. Lakers
| L 117–122
| Tom Chambers (41)
| Tom Chambers (13)
| Kevin Johnson (10)
| Arizona Veterans Memorial Coliseum14,471
| 0–4
|-

Awards and honors

Week/Month
 Tom Chambers was named Player of the Week for games played January 23 through January 29.
 Kevin Johnson was named Player of the Week for games played March 13 through March 19.
 Kevin Johnson was named Player of the Month for February.
 Cotton Fitzsimmons was named Coach of the Month for April.

All-Star
 Tom Chambers was selected as a reserve in the 1989 All-Star Game. It was his second All-Star selection.

Season
 Kevin Johnson received the Most Improved Player Award.
 Eddie Johnson received the Sixth Man of the Year Award.
 Cotton Fitzsimmons received the Coach of the Year Award.
 Jerry Colangelo received the Executive of the Year Award.
 Kevin Johnson was named to the All-NBA Second Team. Johnson also finished 8th in the Most Valuable Player voting.
 Tom Chambers was named to the All-NBA Second Team. Chambers also finished 9th in the Most Valuable Player voting.

Player statistics

Season

|- align="center" bgcolor=""
|  || 81 || style="background:#FF8800;color:#423189;" | 81 || 37.1 || .471 || .326 || .851 || style="background:#FF8800;color:#423189;" | 8.4 || 2.9 || 1.1 || 0.7 || style="background:#FF8800;color:#423189;" | 25.7
|- align="center" bgcolor="#f0f0f0"
|  || 77 || 30 || 21.5 || .540 || .000 || .788 || 5.2 || 1.5 || 1.1 || 0.2 || 8.2
|- align="center" bgcolor=""
|  || 2 || 0 || 3.0 || .000 || . || . || 0.5 || 0.0 || .0 || .0 || 0.0
|- align="center" bgcolor="#f0f0f0"
| * || 2 || 0 || 3.5 || .200 || .000 || 1.000^ || 0.5 || 0.0 || .0 || .0 || 2.0
|- align="center" bgcolor=""
|  || 34 || 1 || 9.4 || .343 || . || .750 || 1.8 || 0.7 || 0.4 || .0 || 1.0
|- align="center" bgcolor="#f0f0f0"
|  || 2 || 0 || 4.5 || .000 || . || .500 || 0.5 || 0.0 || .0 || .0 || 0.5
|- align="center" bgcolor=""
|  || 74 || 60 || 28.6 || .503 || . || .743 || 7.3 || 0.7 || 0.7 || 0.4 || 15.9
|- align="center" bgcolor="#f0f0f0"
| * || 10 || 0 || 9.2 || .444 || .333 || .750 || 0.5 || 0.8 || 0.2 || .0 || 3.9
|- align="center" bgcolor=""
|  || 78 || 73 || 31.9 || .495 || .333 || .826 || 3.4 || 6.0 || 1.7 || 0.1 || 13.5
|- align="center" bgcolor="#f0f0f0"
|  || 70 || 7 || 29.2 || .497 || style="background:#FF8800;color:#423189;" | .413† || .868 || 4.4 || 2.3 || 0.7 || 0.1 || 21.5
|- align="center" bgcolor=""
|  || 81 || style="background:#FF8800;color:#423189;" | 81 || style="background:#FF8800;color:#423189;" | 39.2 || .505 || .091 || style="background:#FF8800;color:#423189;" | .882^ || 4.2 || style="background:#FF8800;color:#423189;" | 12.2 || style="background:#FF8800;color:#423189;" | 1.7 || 0.3 || 20.4
|- align="center" bgcolor="#f0f0f0"
|  || 26 || 0 || 6.0 || .435 || .471† || .667 || 0.7 || 0.9 || 0.3 || .0 || 2.1
|- align="center" bgcolor=""
|  || 62 || 25 || 8.5 || .513 || . || .650 || 2.4 || 0.1 || 0.3 || 0.8 || 2.6
|- align="center" bgcolor="#f0f0f0"
|  || 54 || 5 || 25.1 || .419 || .329 || .614 || 3.9 || 2.4 || 1.2 || 0.3 || 8.6
|- align="center" bgcolor=""
| * || 30 || 0 || 5.5 || .276 || .000 || .429 || 1.8 || 0.3 || 0.1 || .0 || 0.6
|- align="center" bgcolor="#f0f0f0"
|  || 62 || 15 || 9.9 || .537 || .200 || .615 || 2.1 || 0.3 || 0.3 || 0.5 || 4.1
|- align="center" bgcolor=""
|  || style="background:#FF8800;color:#423189;" | 82 || 32 || 24.6 || style="background:#FF8800;color:#423189;" | .653 || . || .535 || 6.7 || 0.5 || 0.4 || style="background:#FF8800;color:#423189;" | 2.3 || 7.2
|}
* – Stats with the Suns.
† – Minimum 55 three-pointers made.
^ – Minimum 125 free throws made.

Playoffs

|- align="center" bgcolor=""
|  || style="background:#FF8800;color:#423189;" | 12 || style="background:#FF8800;color:#423189;" | 12 || style="background:#FF8800;color:#423189;" | 41.3 || .459 || style="background:#FF8800;color:#423189;" | .409 || .859 || style="background:#FF8800;color:#423189;" | 10.9 || 3.8 || 1.1 || 1.3 || style="background:#FF8800;color:#423189;" | 26.0
|- align="center" bgcolor="#f0f0f0"
|  || style="background:#FF8800;color:#423189;" | 12 || style="background:#FF8800;color:#423189;" | 12 || 25.8 || .523 || . || .760 || 7.1 || 2.2 || style="background:#FF8800;color:#423189;" | 2.0 || 0.3 || 9.1
|- align="center" bgcolor=""
|  || 8 || 0 || 9.9 || .429 || . || .500 || 1.9 || 0.1 || 0.6 || .0 || 0.9
|- align="center" bgcolor="f0f0f0"
|  || 9 || 0 || 14.0 || .529 || . || .864 || 5.0 || 0.2 || 0.1 || 0.2 || 8.1
|- align="center" bgcolor=""
|  || style="background:#FF8800;color:#423189;" | 12 || style="background:#FF8800;color:#423189;" | 12 || 31.2 || .497 || .000 || .840 || 5.8 || 5.2 || 1.3 || 0.3 || 14.1
|- align="center" bgcolor="#f0f0f0"
|  || style="background:#FF8800;color:#423189;" | 12 || 0 || 32.7 || .413 || .342 || .769 || 7.3 || 2.1 || 1.0 || 0.2 || 17.8
|- align="center" bgcolor=""
|  || style="background:#FF8800;color:#423189;" | 12 || style="background:#FF8800;color:#423189;" | 12 || 41.2 || .495 || .300 || style="background:#FF8800;color:#423189;" | .927 || 4.3 || style="background:#FF8800;color:#423189;" | 12.3 || 1.6 || 0.4 || 23.8
|- align="center" bgcolor="#f0f0f0"
|  || 4 || 0 || 2.0 || .000 || . || . || 1.5 || 0.3 || .0 || .0 || 0.0
|- align="center" bgcolor=""
|  || style="background:#FF8800;color:#423189;" | 12 || 0 || 29.3 || .438 || .286 || .792 || 4.8 || 1.2 || 1.1 || 0.3 || 14.3
|- align="center" bgcolor="#f0f0f0"
|  || 4 || 0 || 1.5 || .333 || . || . || 0.8 || 0.0 || .0 || .0 || 0.5
|- align="center" bgcolor=""
|  || 4 || 0 || 4.3 || .500 || . || .000 || 0.5 || 0.0 || 0.5 || 0.3 || 1.0
|- align="center" bgcolor="#f0f0f0"
|  || style="background:#FF8800;color:#423189;" | 12 || style="background:#FF8800;color:#423189;" | 12 || 18.9 || style="background:#FF8800;color:#423189;" | .640 || . || .714 || 4.4 || 0.5 || 0.6 || style="background:#FF8800;color:#423189;" | 1.6 || 6.2
|}

Transactions

Trades

Free agents

Additions

Subtractions

Player Transactions Citation:

References

 Standings on Basketball Reference

Phoenix Suns seasons